Steamboat House may refer to:

Steamboat House (Dardanelle, Arkansas), listed on the National Register of Historic Places in Yell County, Arkansas
Steamboat House (New Iberia, Louisiana), listed on the National Register of Historic Places in Iberia Parish, Louisiana
Steamboat House (Huntsville, Texas) Recorded Texas Historic Landmark, residence where Sam Houston died